The year 1956 was the 175th year of the Rattanakosin Kingdom of Thailand. It was the 11th year in the reign of King Bhumibol Adulyadej (Rama IX), and is reckoned as year 2499 in the Buddhist Era.

Incumbents
King: Bhumibol Adulyadej
Crown Prince: (vacant)
Prime Minister: Plaek Phibunsongkhram
Supreme Patriarch: Vajirananavongs

Events

January

February

March

April

May

June

July

August

September

October
22 October - His Majesty King Bhumibol Adulyadej enter monkhood for 15 days.

November
5 November - His Majesty King Bhumibol Adulyadej left the monkhood.

December

Births

 Win Lyovarin, Thai author

Deaths

See also
 List of Thai films of 1956
 1956 in Thai television

References

External links

 
Thailand
Years of the 20th century in Thailand
Thailand
1950s in Thailand